Meghan Marguerite McCain (born October 23, 1984) is an American television personality, columnist, and author. She has worked for ABC News, Fox News, and MSNBC. The daughter of politician John McCain and diplomat Cindy McCain, she has been a public figure for much of her life, first appearing at the 1996 Republican National Convention.

McCain received media attention in her own right in 2007 for her blog, McCain Blogette, on which she documented life on the  John McCain 2008 presidential campaign. In 2009, she became a contributing writer for The Daily Beast. From 2016 to 2017, she co-hosted the daytime talk show Outnumbered. She joined the daytime talk show The View shortly thereafter, co-hosting it until 2021. McCain became a columnist for the Daily Mail website following her departure from The View.

Early life
McCain is the eldest of the four children of Senator John McCain and Cindy McCain. She was born on October 23, 1984, in Phoenix, Arizona, and attended Phoenix Country Day School and Xavier College Preparatory, an all-girl private Catholic high school. She appeared at the 1996 Republican National Convention when she was 11 years of age. On April 5, 2003, McCain was presented to society at the Board of Visitors Debutante Ball at the Camelback Inn in Paradise Valley, Arizona.

She attended Columbia University, where she earned her bachelor's degree in art history in 2007. McCain originally planned to become a music journalist and interned at Newsweek and Saturday Night Live.

Career

2008 presidential election

McCain launched a blog titled McCain Blogette in 2007, documenting her father's presidential campaign as well as musing about fashion, music, and pop culture. On June 12, 2008, McCain wrote on her blog that she had changed her party registration to Republican. She said she did so "as a symbol of my commitment to my Dad and to represent the faith I have in his ability to be an effective leader for our country and to grow and strengthen the Republican party when he is elected president of the United States." In her book Dirty Sexy Politics McCain talks about how she nearly overdosed on Xanax on the day of the election. In 2008, she published a book titled My Dad, John McCain. In an interview on Larry King Live in September 2008, McCain stated that she had been too busy to have a romantic relationship while on her father's campaign trail.

Although her blogging was devoted to gaining support for her father among the Generation Y electorate, by October, Steve Schmidt and other McCain campaign staffers had substantially limited her appearances on the campaign, deeming her "too controversial."

Subsequent career
McCain began writing for The Daily Beast in January 2009. In March 2009, she wrote an article for The Daily Beast titled "My Beef With Ann Coulter." In this article, she questioned Republican support for conservative author and columnist Ann Coulter. While Coulter did not respond, conservative radio talk show host Laura Ingraham challenged McCain's article by comparing her to a "valley girl." Ingraham also mocked McCain: "Ok, I was really hoping that I was going to get that role in The Real World, but then I realized that, well, they don't like plus-sized models." McCain responded to Ingraham in a second article for The Daily Beast titled "Quit Talking About My Weight, Laura Ingraham": "Instead of intellectually debating our ideological differences about the future of the Republican Party, Ingraham resorted to making fun of my age and weight, in the fashion of the mean girls in high school." McCain also stated that she thought the change in discourse toward her body was "terrible" and further argued, "When Tyra Banks went on her show in a bathing suit and said 'kiss my fat ass,' that's what I feel like. Kiss my fat ass!" Ingraham responded by calling McCain a "useful idiot." During a later interview on Larry King Live, McCain said that as far as she is concerned, "with what's going on with Laura Ingraham, on my end, it's over." She also told King that Coulter never responded to her article, which, she stated, "is fine with me.... All I wanted to do is show women that you don't have to be Ann Coulter and Laura Ingraham to have a place in the Republican Party.... Supriya Jindal is a good role model, but a lot of people hadn't heard of her."

In April 2009, she signed a six-figure book deal with Hyperion. She described her aims in this way: "All I am trying to be is a young, cool Republican woman for other Republican women." Politico stated that while John McCain did not emerge from the 2008 election victorious, "his Bud Light–drinking, talk-show–appearing, insouciantly Twittering 24-year-old daughter" did." Speaking at the 2009 Log Cabin Republican Convention, McCain said there was "a war brewing in the Republican Party" between the past and the future, and that "Most of the old school Republicans are scared shitless of that future." She followed that by saying her enjoyment of Twitter was diminished by the presence of top Republican strategist Karl Rove, saying, "I can't shake the fact that Karl Rove is following me—it can be creepy" and "We need to take Twitter back from the creepy people."

Statements such as these led news reports and commentators including Rachel Maddow and Kathleen Parker to conclude that McCain had the same "maverick gene" as her father. Following the April 2009 party switch by Senator Arlen Specter from Republican to Democratic, conservative commentator Rush Limbaugh suggested that many Republicans wished both McCain and her father would leave too. Her tweet in response was, "RED TIL I'M DEAD BABY!!! I love the Republican party enough to give it constructive criticism, I love my party and sure as hell not leavin'!"

On a May 2009 episode of the Colbert Report, she stated her support for sex education and criticized Bristol Palin's sexual abstinence campaign, saying it was "not realistic for this generation". McCain also stated her own desires for the Republican Party: "It can be a party for a 24-year-old pro-sex woman. It can be." After John McCain campaign fixture Joe the Plumber made some anti-gay remarks (saying he would not have "queers ... anywhere near my children") in mid-2009, Meghan McCain took aim at him, saying "Joe the Plumber—you can quote me—is a dumbass. He should stick to plumbing." In September 2009 and February 2010, McCain had repeat stints as guest co-host of The View. In September 2010, she appeared on the NPR news quiz show Wait, Wait, Don't Tell Me and won a prize for a listener.

Her campaign memoir, Dirty Sexy Politics, was published in September 2010. In it she expresses her opinions about Sarah Palin and describes her relationships with the McCain campaign staff. She states that the Republican Party seemed "to have lost its way in the last ten years," that the conservative movement seemed "hell-bent on restricting our freedoms rather than expanding them," and that within the Republican Party, she felt a certain stress to take over the ideas of others, like Mitt Romney, especially regarding same-sex marriage, which was a danger for the existence of the party. The New York Times described the book as a coming-of-age narrative about herself. However, other reviews were more scathing. Leon H. Wolf wrote, "It is impossible to read Dirty, Sexy Politics and come away with the impression that you have read anything other than the completely unedited ramblings of an idiot." During the promotional tour for the book, McCain canceled an appearance at Juniata College owing to what she called "unforeseen professional circumstances." However, according to her Twitter, she was actually in Las Vegas on a girls' weekend, as she got over a boyfriend ending their relationship via e-mail.

McCain has publicly discussed her struggles with grief from the death of her father, John McCain in 2018. In December 2019, McCain spoke with Dr. Lucy Kalanithi on stage at the annual End Well Symposium about challenging taboos and destigmatizing conversations about grief and death.

In September 2021, McCain became an opinion columnist for the tabloid newspaper the Daily Mail.

In April 2022 McCain published a memoir titled Bad Republican which sold 244 copies in its opening week.

Television career
A month-long road trip with comedian Michael Ian Black in the summer of 2011 led to a collaboration on the 2012 book America, You Sexy Bitch: A Love Letter to Freedom. In it, McCain lambasts Republican strategist Karl Rove for what she believes was his role in the attacks against her younger sister in her father's 2000 presidential campaign, castigates Bill Clinton for his actions in the Lewinsky scandal, but despite ideological differences, praises Hillary Clinton for having "pushed through many doors and shattered many glass ceilings for women in politics. I love women who don't put up with shit, and Hillary clearly doesn't." In November 2011, McCain became an analyst on MSNBC, and immediately got into a back-and-forth with 2012 Republican presidential candidate Newt Gingrich.

In September 2013, her road-based talk show Raising McCain began on the start-up Pivot cable and satellite television channel. It was canceled in January 2014. She was later added as a co-host to the show TakePart Live on the same channel, appearing with Jacob Soboroff beginning in May 2014. The show was canceled in December 2014.

She signed on as a Fox News contributor in July 2015 and was named a regular co-host of the afternoon talk program Outnumbered on November 14, 2016. Following her departure from both the program and the network in September 2017, McCain was named a permanent co-host of the ABC daytime talk show The View. She made her debut on the October 9, 2017, episode. She had previously guest co-hosted the show in 2008 and 2010. She announced her exit from the show after her fourth season in July 2021.

Political positions

McCain describes herself as "a woman who despises labels and boxes and stereotypes" and politically identifies as a Republican who is "liberal on social issues." She registered as an independent voter when she was 18 years old and voted for John Kerry in the 2004 presidential election. She has stated that she is pro-life as well as in favor of sex education and birth control. She has expressed an opinion that conservatives demonstrate hypocrisy regarding abortion: "They go on and on about how evil and wrong abortion is, but don't like to talk about how easy it is to not get pregnant."

McCain agrees with her father's positions on global warming, stem-cell research, and supporting environmentalist legislation. At first she had doubts about the 2003 invasion of Iraq but subsequently supported her father's pro-intervention position regarding it. She objected to the Arizona SB1070 anti-illegal immigration law, which her father supported. In terms of economic policy, she once remarked on The Rachel Maddow Show: "I didn't even take econ[omics] in college. I don't completely understand it so I'd hate to make a comment one way or the other. That's—truly of all the things—I keep reading and I just don't understand it."

McCain has campaigned for gay rights, and she has commented that the cause of the gay community for equality is "one of the ones closest to my heart." In this way, she spoke at the Log Cabin Republicans convention in April 2009, describing her cultural and political perspectives with the declaration: "I am concerned about the environment. I love to wear black. I think government is best when it stays out of people's lives and business as much as possible. I love punk rock. I believe in a strong national defense. I have a tattoo. I believe government should always be efficient and accountable. I have lots of gay friends. And, yes, I am a Republican." She supports same-sex marriage and gay adoption. In June 2009, McCain posed for the NOH8 Campaign, a celebrity photo project that protests California's Proposition 8 constitutional amendment banning same-sex marriage, which her mother Cindy also posed for. She was in favor of repealing "Don't ask, don't tell" and allowing gays and lesbians to serve openly in the U.S. military, a position her father adopted prior to his 2008 presidential run. She also co-hosted GLAAD's Concert for Love and Acceptance in Nashville in 2015. McCain described the Trump administration's ban on transgender service as "an unfair, un-American, and dangerous policy."

In the 2016 presidential election, she did not vote for Hillary Clinton or Donald Trump, instead writing in Evan McMullin. On September 1, 2018, she delivered a eulogy at her father's funeral at Washington National Cathedral. In an emotional eulogy to her father, McCain mourned her father's passing as the "passing of American greatness, the real thing." In what was widely seen as a sharp rebuke of Donald Trump, McCain remarked: "The America of John McCain has no need to be made great again because America was always great."

McCain spoke out against the 2021 United States Capitol attack, saying on The View: "I'm not against sending these people to Gitmo. ... These are domestic terrorists who attacked our own republic. They should be treated the same way we treat Al-Qaeda." She also said, "The bedrock of our democracy and the bedrock of who we are as Americans is the peaceful transition of power. And he is clearly a president who has turned into a mad king." She then called for the 25th Amendment to be invoked, and Trump to be removed from office.

Personal life
In July 2017, McCain became engaged to conservative writer and commentator Ben Domenech. They were married on November 21, 2017, at McCain's family ranch in Page Springs, Arizona. In July 2019, McCain revealed that she had miscarried earlier that year. She gave birth to the couple's first daughter in 2020. McCain gave birth to a second daughter in January 2023.

Awards and nominations

Writings

See also
 Broadcast journalism
 New Yorkers in journalism

References

External links

 Column archives at The Daily Beast
 
 
 
 
 

1984 births
Living people
21st-century American non-fiction writers
21st-century American women writers
ABC News personalities
American Christian Zionists
American debutantes
American people of English descent
American people of Scotch-Irish descent
American people of Swedish descent
American political commentators
American political writers
American television talk show hosts
American women bloggers
American bloggers
American women columnists
American women non-fiction writers
Arizona Republicans
Baptists from Arizona
Columbia College (New York) alumni
Fox News people
American LGBT rights activists
McCain family
Neoconservatism
New York (state) Republicans
Protestants from Arizona
Right-wing politics in the United States
Writers from Arizona
Writers from Phoenix, Arizona
Women who experienced pregnancy loss